The Montana State League was a minor league baseball league that played various seasons between 1892 and 1925 as an Independent league. As the name implies, the Montana State League consisted of teams based in exclusively in Montana, with the exception of the 1909 season when Idaho and Utah were represented. The Montana State League played just the three documented minor league seasons and had several other seasons of professional play without official records.

History
The Montana State League first began play as a non–classified league in 1887. The league also played a season in 1891. The teams are unknown in both seasons, with no official records available.

The Montana State League began as six–team Class B level minor league in 1892. The league played a split–season schedule. The Bozeman and Great Falls franchises disbanded on July 23, 1892, after the conclusion of the first half.  he overall standings were Helena (29–21), Butte (26–22), Philipsburg Burgers (22–23) and Missoula (18–29).. Bozeman had a record of 10–8 and the Great Falls Smelter Cities 6–10 when they folded. Butte won the first–half championship and Missoula won the second–half title. Butte won the overall championship. Helena allegedly forfeited over complaints regarding money and umpiring. Baseball Hall of Fame member Clark Griffith played for Missoula in 1892. It was reported Griffith pitched so well in one game that Missoula fans showered him with gold coins after the game. Griffith later bought property and built a home in Montana.

After the 1892 season, there were strong allegations of betting and cheating. The league did not return in 1893.

The league played a season in 1898 with no records existing and the league was not classified.

In 1900, the Montana State League reformed as a four–team Independent minor league. The league president was William Henry Lucas. The overall league standings featured the Anaconda Serpents (34–37), Butte Smoke Eaters (30–40), Great Falls Indians (39–32) and Helena Senators (39–33). Helena won the first–half championship and Great Falls won the second–half title. Baseball Hall of Fame member Joe Tinker played for both the Great Falls Indians and Helena Senators in 1900 at age 19.

The Montana State League played a season in 1905, Butte, Great Falls, Helena and Missoula composed the league. No league standings or records are available.

In 1909, the Montana State League played as a four–team league, adding teams in Idaho and Utah. The league comprised Helena (35–16), the Salt Lake City Cubs (34–17), Butte (20–31) and Boise (13–38).

In 1925, the Montana State League played a final season as a four team Independent minor league. Butte, Great Falls, Helena and Missoula played in the league, which has no official results.

Montana State League teams

Standings and statistics

1892 Montana State League

1900 Montana State League

1909 Montana State League

Baseball Hall of Fame alumni
Clark Griffith (1900), Mizzoula. Inducted, 1946
Joe Tinker (1900) Great Falls Indians & Helena Senators. Inducted, 1946

References

Defunct minor baseball leagues in the United States
Baseball leagues in Montana
Baseball leagues in Idaho
Baseball leagues in Utah
Sports leagues disestablished in 1909
Sports leagues established in 1892